Senator Fasano may refer to:

Len Fasano (born 1958), Connecticut State Senate
Mike Fasano (born 1958), Florida State Senate